Kawika Tennefos Shoji (born November 11, 1987) is an American former professional volleyball player. He was a member of the US national team from 2011 to 2021. The 2014 World League and the 2015 World Cup winner.

Personal life
Kawika's parents are Dave and Mary Shoji. His younger brother Erik Shoji is also a player (libero) for the United States men's national team. He and his wife, Megan, married in 2014. On March 16, 2018 their daughter Ada–Jean Ehiku Shoji was born in Milan, Italy.

Honours

Clubs
 National championships
 2011/2012  German Championship, with Berlin Recycling Volleys
 2012/2013  German Championship, with Berlin Recycling Volleys
 2013/2014  German Championship, with Berlin Recycling Volleys

References

External links

 Player profile at TeamUSA.org
 
 Player profile at LegaVolley.it 
 Player profile at PlusLiga.pl 
 
 
 Player profile at Volleybox.net

1987 births
Living people
American sportspeople of Japanese descent
Volleyball players from Honolulu
American men's volleyball players
Volleyball players at the 2016 Summer Olympics
Volleyball players at the 2020 Summer Olympics
Olympic bronze medalists for the United States in volleyball
Medalists at the 2016 Summer Olympics
American expatriate sportspeople in Finland
Expatriate volleyball players in Finland
American expatriate sportspeople in Germany
Expatriate volleyball players in Germany
American expatriate sportspeople in Turkey
Expatriate volleyball players in Turkey
American expatriate sportspeople in Russia
Expatriate volleyball players in Russia
American expatriate sportspeople in Italy
Expatriate volleyball players in Italy
American expatriate sportspeople in Poland
Expatriate volleyball players in Poland
Stanford Cardinal men's volleyball players
Arkas Spor volleyball players
Resovia (volleyball) players
Setters (volleyball)